Baberu is a town and a nagar panchayat in Banda district  in the state of Uttar Pradesh, India. It is one of four tehsils (subdistricts) of the Banda district.

The nearest river that flows to this tehsil is the Yamuna, which is 18 km away from this place. There is a major temple called Madidai Ka Mandir.

It is connected to major cities by paved single lane roads, and is about 130 km from Kanpur and 200 km from Lucknow, the capital of Uttar Pradesh.

Description
It has an average elevation of 112 metres (367 feet).

Baberu's climate is characterized by a hot summer (March-June), pleasant monsoon (July to September and cold winter (October-February).

 India census, Baberu had a population of 14,499. Males constitute 54% of the population and females 46%. Baberu has an average literacy rate of 60%, higher than the national average of 59.5%, with 64% of the males and 36% of females literate. 17% of the population is under 6 years of age.

There are a few small local schools. i.e. New Lucknow Public School located at Banda Road is a CBSE affiliated English Medium School. Agriculture is the primary industry.

2019up - Aryan tiwari
 2017  - Chandrapal Kushwaha (Babuji) (BJP)
 2012  - Vishambhar Singh Yadav    (SP)
 2007  - Vishambhar Singh Yadav  (SP)
 2002  - Gaya Charan Dinkar (BSP)
 1996  - Skiv Shankar (BJP)
 1993	- Gaya Charan Dinkar (BSP) 	 
 1991	- Gaya Charan Dinkar (BSP) 
 1989	- Dev Kumar Yadav 	 
 1985	- Dev Kumar Yadav 	
 1980	- Rameshwar Bhai 
 1977	- Dev Kumar Yadav 
 1974  - Dev Kumar Yadav 
 1969  - Durhjan Bhai
 1967  - Deshraj Singh 
 1962  - Deshraj Singh 
 1957  - Ramsanehi Bhartiya 
 1951  - Ramsanehi Bhartiya

References

Baberu got its name from the ancient king Babaruddin.

External links
 Location from google maps
 Location from wikimapia
 BSNL Telephone directory search
 Public bus service search from nearest city banda
 Few demographic details
 Banda district
 Sukhdev Singh Lavkush Degree College
 Banda District official Portal
 Baberu MLA
 Directory information
 New Lucknow Public School Banda Road Baberu
 New Lucknow Public School Banda Road Baberu

Cities and towns in Banda district, India
[( SUNRISE MAHAVIDHYALAY, BABERU-BANDA )}